Jean Guéguen (1 April 1924 – 9 May 1998) was a French racing cyclist. He rode in the 1951 Tour de France.

Major results

1945
 1st  Road race, National Amateur Road Championships
1948
 1st Stages 8 (ITT), 14 (ITT) & 15 Volta a Portugal
1949
 1st Stage 5b Critérium du Dauphiné Libéré
 1st Stages 11 & 15b Volta a Portugal
1951
 1st Paris–Brussels
 1st Circuit de la Haute-Savoie
 2nd Overall Paris–Saint-Étienne
1st Stage 2
 2nd Paris–Montceau-les-Mines
 5th Paris–Roubaix
1952
 1st Paris–Clermont-Ferrand
 1st Stage 5 Tour d'Algérie
 1st Stage 9 Tour de l'Ouest
 3rd Bordeaux–Paris
1953
 1st Paris–Camembert
 1st Paris–Montceau-les-Mines
1954
 1st Circuit du Morbihan
 3rd Paris–Camembert

References

1924 births
1998 deaths
French male cyclists
Cyclists from Paris